San Diego de Alcala Church is a parish church in Valenzuela, located about  north of Manila in the Philippines. The original church was the oldest church in the city, built by Father Juan Taranco and finished by Father Jose Valencia in 1632. Destroyed during World War II, its surviving belfry is the oldest in the city.

History
The Church of San Diego de Alcala in Brgy. Polo in Valenzuela was completed in 1632. Residents were forced into labor to complete the church after the town gained its independence in 1623 from Catangalan through the efforts of Father Juan Taranco and Don Juan Monsod, the barangay head of Polo.  The main structure was destroyed by bombs during the Japanese occupation of the Philippines in World War II.  The belfry and entrance are the only parts of the four-century old edifice that remain today. They have been preserved by the citizens of Polo (now Valenzuela City).

Bell tower of San Diego de Alcala Church
The belfry or bell tower of San Diego de Alcala Church is a cultural and religious relic of the bygone Spanish era.  A new church has since been rebuilt and renovated adjacent to the ruins, serving as an aesthetic counterpoint to the largely unchanged tower.

Feast day
Residents of barangays Polo and Poblacion celebrate the feast day of San Diego de Alcala on 12 November every year.  Together with the fiesta, the town also celebrates the "Putong Polo Festival", a food festival honoring the putong Polo, a local variety of the Philippine rice cake puto.

References

External links

Roman Catholic churches in Metro Manila
Buildings and structures in Valenzuela, Metro Manila
1632 establishments in New Spain
Churches in the Roman Catholic Diocese of Malolos